Events from the year 2023 in Wales.

Incumbents

First Minister – Mark Drakeford
Secretary of State for Wales – David T. C. Davies
Archbishop of Wales – Andy John, Bishop of Bangor
Archdruid of the National Eisteddfod of Wales – Myrddin ap Dafydd
National Poet of Wales – Hanan Issa

Events

January
1 January – The 2023 New Year Honours List includes footballer Sophie Ingle (OBE) and academic Colin Riordan (CBE). Politicians Chris Bryant and Julian Lewis receive knighthoods.
4 January – Public and Commercial Services Union workers begin the first of their 6-day strikes due to issues regarding salary, pensions, job security and redundancy terms. Driving tests are cancelled in seventeen testing centres across Wales.
10 January – Hungarian airline Wizz Air announces they will cease all operations to and from Cardiff Airport amid challenging macro-economic environment and high operational costs.
14 January – 250 members of the Welsh language campaign group Cymdeithas yr Iaith gather to protest in Carmarthen aiming to promote greater support for the Welsh language and calling for more Welsh-medium schools to be established across Wales. Welsh folk singer and cultural icon Dafydd Iwan performs Yma o Hyd and speaks in support of the movement.
16 January – The NAHT Cymru and NEU trade unions announce a four day walkout by teachers in a dispute over pay. NAHT Cymru wants a pay rise that matches the on-going inflation surge plus a 5% rise. The NEU is asking for a 12% adjustment.
19 January – Local authorities receive £208m for 11 projects from round two of UK Government's Levelling Up Fund attracting criticism from the Welsh Government as Wales remains £1.1bn worse off than previous European Union inequality schemes, while Plaid Cymru critiques the system by which the money is distributed calling it arbitrary and ad-hoc.
24 January – The Welsh Government launches a 12-week consultation process on plans to introduce mandatory licensing for tattoo artists, body piercers and cosmetic clinics, which will make Wales the first UK nation to introduce a register for practitioners.
28 January – The Welsh Government announces that Clare Drakeford, the wife of First Minister Mark Drakeford, has died suddenly.
30 January – Dr Sarah Myhill, a private practitioner from Powys, who posted false claims about COVID-19 vaccines online, is banned from practising for nine months after a hearing conducted by the Medical Practitioners Tribunal Service.

February
14 February – 
All major road building projects in Wales, including the proposed Third Menai Crossing, are scrapped amid concerns about the environment.
The BBC Welsh Service (now BBC Cymru Wales) marks the 100th anniversary of the BBC's first broadcast in Wales.
16 February – The funeral of Clare Drakeford is held in Cardiff, and attended by senior politicians.
 20 February – Three days of strikes involving almost half of ambulance workers in Wales begin, with members of the GMB union walking out on 20 February, and members of the Unite union walking out on 21 and 22 February. 
 21 February – Ambulance workers belonging to the Unite union call two strikes for 6 and 10 March.
22 February – The NASUWT teaching union rejects a revised pay offer from the Welsh Government.
23 February – The National Health Service in Wales misses its first post-COVID target for reducing the backlog of outpatients waiting for an appointment, with 75,000 people waiting for a year or more when there should be none.
24 February – 
Devil's Gulch, a popular walking spot in the Elan Valley, is reopened to the public five years after it was closed following a rockfall.
An earthquake measuring 3.7 magnitude strikes Brynmawr, Blaenau Gwent at 11.59pm.

March
3 March – The Unite and GMB unions call off a planned strike by the Welsh Ambulance Service scheduled for Monday 6 March after "significant progress" in talks with the Welsh Government.
6 March – Three people are found dead nearly two days after being reported missing, after their car is spotted by a police helicopter, having crashed into trees in the outskirts of Cardiff. Two survivors are taken to hospital in a critical condition.
8 March – 
Members of the Welsh Ambulance Service belonging to the Unite union call off a strike scheduled for Friday 10 March following "progress" with officials from the Welsh Government.
In what is believed to be the first case of its kind in the UK, the widow of a nurse who died as a result of COVID-19 is to sue the National Health Service in Wales. Linda Roberts, the widow of Gareth Roberts, who had Type 2 diabetes, plans the legal action after a coroner found that he died as a result of "industrial disease".
10 March – Members of the National Education Union in Wales call off two strikes planned for 15 and 16 March after receiving a new pay offer from the Welsh Government.
13 March – A man is killed in a gas explosion at a house in Morriston area of Swansea. He is subsequently identified as a 68-year-old pensioner.

Arts and literature

National Eisteddfod of Wales
Chair:
Crown:  
Prose Medal:
Drama Medal:

Music

Opera
Blaze of Glory!, an opera by David Hackbridge Johnson, with libretto by Emma Jenkins, is premiered by Welsh National Opera, starring Jeffrey Lloyd-Roberts, Themba Mvula and Rebecca Evans.

Broadcasting
8 February – S4C wins the "Best Multi-Channel Programme" Award at the Broadcast Awards 2023 for Fi, Rhyw ac Anabledd.

English language radio
Early breakfast show on Radio 2 Wales, presented by Owain Wyn Evans

English language television
Dark Land: Hunting the Killers, series 2

Welsh language radio

Welsh language television
Drych: Y Dyn yn y Van

Sport

January
9 January – Welsh football legend and widely regarded as one of the best players ever, Gareth Bale announces his retirement from football.
11 January – The English Football League lifts the transfer embargo against Cardiff City after they paid the first installment in the controversial transfer deal with Nantes regarding Emiliano Sala.
18 January – The Football Association of Wales agrees a landmark deal that will see equal pay introduced with immediate effect across both men and women national football team's respectively.

February
7 February – Swansea City footballer Joe Allen announces his retirement from international duties with the Wales national football team.
21 February – Wales delays the announcement of its line up for the Six Nations match against England on 25 February as the threat of strike action by the Wales team continues.
22 February – Following an agreement between rugby union players and the Welsh Rugby Union (WRU), it is confirmed the England v Wales match scheduled for 25 February will go ahead.

March
7 March – AFC Wimbledon footballer Chris Gunter announces his retirement from international duties with the Wales national football team. He became the first Welsh footballer to reach 100 caps at a international level.

12 March – Swindon Town footballer Jonny Williams announces his retirement from international duties with the Wales national football team.
17 March – Adran Premier club Wrexham AFC Women set a Welsh women's domestic football attendance record, breaking Cardiff City's record of 5,175 against Abergavenny Town.

Deaths

4 January – , broadcaster, 61.
28 January – Clare Drakeford, wife of Mark Drakeford, 71
9 February – Charlie Faulkner, rugby international and coach, 81
14 February – Christine Pritchard, actress (Pobol y Cwm, Cara Fi), 79

References

 
2020s in Wales
Years of the 21st century in Wales
Wales
Wales